Walter Emil Brödel (19 December 1925 – 3 May 1989) was a German fencer who competed for Saar at the 1952 Summer Olympics. He fenced in the team foil and sabre events. He committed suicide in 1989.

See also
 Saar at the 1952 Summer Olympics

References

1925 births
1989 deaths
1989 suicides
German male fencers
Olympic fencers of Saar
Fencers at the 1952 Summer Olympics
Sportspeople from Saarbrücken
Suicides in Germany
20th-century German people